Erkin Tuniyaz (also spelled Arkin Tuniyaz; born December 1961) is a Chinese politician of Uyghur descent who is the current deputy secretary of the Chinese Communist Party Xinjiang Committee and chairman of Xinjiang Uyghur Autonomous Region, in office since 30 September 2021. He is a member of the 20th Central Committee of the Chinese Communist Party.

Biography
Erken Tuniyaz was born in Aksu County, Xinjiang, in December 1961.

After graduating from Changji Normal School in 1983, he stayed at the university and worked successively as deputy secretary and secretary of the Communist Youth League of China. After a short period of working in the Department of Personnel Matters of Xinjiang Uygur Autonomous Region in August 1992, he was dispatched to the Organization Department of the CCP's Xinjiang Uygur Autonomous Region Committee, where he eventually rose to become deputy head in October 1999. In February 2005, he was transferred to Hotan Prefecture and appointed deputy party secretary and mayor. In January 2008, he was appointed vice chairman of Xinjiang, and was promoted to member of the standing committee of the CCP Xinjiang Regional Committee, the region's top authority. On 30 September 2021, he was named acting chairman of Xinjiang, replacing Shohrat Zakir. On 27 January 2022, he was formally elected as the chairman by the 13th People's Congress of the Xinjiang Uygur Autonomous Region at its fifth session. On 18 January 2023, he was elected as the chairman for a full term by the 14th People's Congress of the Xinjiang Uygur Autonomous Region.

He was an alternate member of the 19th Central Committee of the Chinese Communist Party and a member of the 20th Central Committee of the Chinese Communist Party.

U.S. sanctions 
On 10 December 2021, the U.S. Department of the Treasury added Erkin to its Specially Designated Nationals (SDN) list. Individuals on the list have their assets blocked and U.S. persons are generally prohibited from dealing with them.

Notes

References

1961 births
Living people
Alternate members of the 19th Central Committee of the Chinese Communist Party
Central Party School of the Chinese Communist Party alumni
Chinese Communist Party politicians from Xinjiang
Delegates to the 17th National Congress of the Chinese Communist Party
Delegates to the 20th National Congress of the Chinese Communist Party
Delegates to the 13th National People's Congress
People from Aksu Prefecture
People's Republic of China politicians from Xinjiang
Political office-holders in Xinjiang
Members of the 20th Central Committee of the Chinese Communist Party
Shaanxi Normal University alumni
Specially Designated Nationals and Blocked Persons List
Uyghur politicians
Xinjiang University alumni